"Unforgettable" is the 90th episode of the science fiction television series Star Trek: Voyager, the 22nd episode of the fourth season.  It was directed by Star Trek: Deep Space Nine recurring guest actor Andrew J. Robinson who portrayed the Cardassian character Elim Garak.

The episode was broadcast on the United Paramount Network (UPN) on April 22, 1998. The USS Voyager is visited by a mysterious alien woman, Kellin (played by guest star Virginia Madsen). Another guest star in this episode is actor Michael Canavan.

The episode depicts a Bussard ramjet, a real-world technology proposal.  In this episode the Star Trek version is said to take in deuterium.  Bussard jets have been proposed to scoop up fuel for a spacecraft's engines, allowing the plot a scientific yet fictional element use of technology.

Plot
An alien woman named Kellin (Virginia Madsen) requests asylum aboard the Federation starship Voyager. When she comes aboard, The Doctor attempts to scan her but his tricorder does not retain any data about her. She is from a race called the Ramura, whose biochemistry is such that neither minds nor technology can retain memories of them for more than a few hours. She claims that she came aboard Voyager a month ago to track down a Ramuran fugitive, and that during that time she and Voyagers First Officer, Chakotay, fell in love. The crew looks into it and evidence seems to support her claim that she was on Voyager. Chakotay does not remember her, but as they work together he understands that he could have developed feelings for her.

Just as Chakotay and Kellin start to pick up where they left off, another member of her race appears and fires a weapon at her. The effect of the weapon is to disintegrate her memories of her experiences aboard Voyager. This time, Chakotay is the one trying to convince her that they fell in love, but she is unresponsive and wants to return home. Kellin and the other Ramuran eventually depart Voyager, telling Chakotay that it would be better if he just forgot about her. Chakotay wants to remember everything about this experience, and as they have loaded a virus into the computer which will erase all record of their encounter with Voyager, he records events with an old-fashioned pen and paper.

Production
"Unforgettable" was directed by Andrew Robinson, who played Garak on Star Trek: Deep Space Nine.   The second wave of Star Trek (1979-2005) had actor-directors, starting with Jonathan Frakes directing "The Offspring" episode of Star Trek: The Next Generation (aired March 12, 1990).  Besides playing major character first officer William Riker of the USS Enterprise-D he directed other episodes and movies.  Other examples include feature films based on the original series cast that were directed by Leonard Nimoy and William Shatner.

The aliens presented in this episode, the Ramurans, were noted for the ability to make others forget their existence and stealth technology.

Reception
This episode is noted as one of a series focused on the Chakotay character with a romance aspect.  The other episodes include "Unity", "In the Flesh, and "Resolutions".

References

External links
 

1998 American television episodes
Fiction about memory erasure and alteration
Star Trek: Voyager (season 4) episodes